National Highway 702D, commonly called NH 702D is a national highway in states of Nagaland and Assam in India. It is an offshoot of primary National Highway 2. This new highway has been accorded national status to upgrade it to two lanes and provide better movement for defense personnel and goods movement.

Route 
NH2 near Mokokchung, Mariani, NH715 near Jorhat

Junctions  

Terminal with NH 2 near Mokokchung.

Terminal with NH 215 near Jorhat.

See also 
List of National Highways in India by highway number

References

External links
 NH 702D on OpenStreetMap

National highways in India
National Highways in Nagaland
National Highways in Assam
Mokokchung district
Transport in Jorhat